Ahmadabad-e Pain may refer to:
 Ahmadabad-e Pain, East Azerbaijan
 Ahmadabad-e Pain, Hamadan
 Ahmadabad-e Pain, Kermanshah
 Ahmadabad-e Pain, Razavi Khorasan
 Ahmadabad-e Pain, West Azerbaijan

See also
 Ahmadabad-e Sofla (disambiguation)